Jussy is a commune in the Yonne department in Bourgogne-Franche-Comté in north-central France. The inhabitants are called Jussiens.

See also
 Communes of the Yonne department

References

Communes of Yonne